The Captain Cook Stakes is a Group 1 Thoroughbred horse race run at weight-for-age over a distance of 1,600 metres (1 mile) at Trentham Racecourse in Wellington, New Zealand.

Over the years the race has been won by great New Zealand racehorses such as Rough Habit (1992), Solveig (1986) and Copper Belt (1977).

History

Name

 Marlboro Mile (1977-1979)
 Penfolds-Chardon Mile (1980-1981)
 DB Mile (1982-1983)
 Double Brown 1600 (1984-1985)
 Double Brown Mile (1986-1988)
 DB Draught 1600 (1989)
 Captain Cook Stakes (1990-2000)
 Fayette Park Prized Stakes (2001)
 Captain Cook Stakes (2002–Present)

Race Date

 Run In March (1977-1997)
 Run In October (1998-2008)
 Run In December (2009–Present)

In 2009 the Wellington Racing Club changed the race date from the end of October to the beginning of December, to move it away from the Hawke's Bay Spring Carnival races such as the Spring Classic.  Instead the Captain Cook Stakes was fitted in to be three to four weeks after the Coupland's Bakeries Mile [Churchill Stakes] at Riccarton in November and three weeks before the Zabeel Classic [Galaxy Stakes] at Ellerslie on Boxing Day.

Results

See also

 Thoroughbred racing in New Zealand
 Wellington Cup
 Thorndon Mile
 New Zealand Oaks
 Trentham Stakes

References

 http://wellingtonracing.co.nz/captain-cook-handicap-winners.aspx
 N.Z. Thoroughbred Racing Inc.
 http://www.racenet.com.au
 http://www.nzracing.co.nz
 http://www.tab.co.nz
 http://www.racebase.co.nz
 The Great Decade of New Zealand racing 1970-1980. Glengarry, Jack. William Collins Publishers Ltd, Wellington, New Zealand.
 New Zealand Thoroughbred Racing Annual 2018 (47th edition). Dennis Ryan, Editor, Racing Media NZ Limited, Auckland, New Zealand.
 New Zealand Thoroughbred Racing Annual 2017 (46th edition). Dennis Ryan, Editor, Racing Media NZ Limited, Auckland, New Zealand.
 New Zealand Thoroughbred Racing Annual 2008 (37th edition). Bradford, David, Editor.  Bradford Publishing Limited, Paeroa, New Zealand.
 New Zealand Thoroughbred Racing Annual 2005 (34th edition). Bradford, David, Editor.  Bradford Publishing Limited, Paeroa, New Zealand.
 New Zealand Thoroughbred Racing Annual 2004 (33rd edition). Bradford, David, Editor.  Bradford Publishing Limited, Paeroa, New Zealand.
 New Zealand Thoroughbred Racing Annual 2000 (29th edition). Bradford, David, Editor.  Bradford Publishing Limited, Auckland, New Zealand.
 New Zealand Thoroughbred Racing Annual 1997  (26th edition). Dillon, Mike, Editor. Mike Dillon's Racing Enterprises Ltd, Auckland, New Zealand.
 New Zealand Thoroughbred Racing Annual 1995 (24th edition). Dillon, Mike, Editor. Mike Dillon's Racing Enterprises Ltd, Auckland, New Zealand.
 New Zealand Thoroughbred Racing Annual 1994 (23rd edition). Dillon, Mike, Editor. Meadowset Publishing, Auckland, New Zealand.
 New Zealand Thoroughbred Racing Annual 1991  (20th edition). Dillon, Mike, Editor. Moa Publications, Auckland, New Zealand.
 New Zealand Thoroughbred Racing Annual 1987 (16th edition). Dillon, Mike, Editor. Moa Publications, Auckland, New Zealand.
 New Zealand Thoroughbred Racing Annual 1985 (Fourteenth edition). Costello, John, Editor. Moa Publications, Auckland, New Zealand.
 New Zealand Thoroughbred Racing Annual 1984 (Thirteenth edition). Costello, John, Editor. Moa Publications, Auckland, New Zealand.
 New Zealand Thoroughbred Racing Annual 1982 (Eleventh edition). Costello, John, Editor. Moa Publications, Auckland, New Zealand.
 New Zealand Thoroughbred Racing Annual 1981 (Tenth edition). Costello, John, Editor. Moa Publications, Auckland, New Zealand.
 New Zealand Thoroughbred Racing Annual 1980 (Ninth edition). Costello, John, Editor. Moa Publications, Auckland, New Zealand.
 New Zealand Thoroughbred Racing Annual 1979 (Eighth edition).Costello, John, Editor. Moa Publications, Auckland, New Zealand.
 New Zealand Thoroughbred Racing Annual 1978 (Seventh edition).Costello, John, Editor. Moa Publications, Auckland, New Zealand.
 New Zealand Thoroughbred Racing Annual 1976. Costello, John, Editor. Moa Publications, Auckland.

Horse races in New Zealand